Volga is an unincorporated community in Johnson County, Kentucky, United States. Its ZIP Code is 41219. Volga is located at an elevation of 718 feet (219 m).

References

Unincorporated communities in Johnson County, Kentucky
Unincorporated communities in Kentucky